Jetalpur is a town in the Ahmedabad district of the Indian state of Gujarat. It is the location of a Swaminarayan temple commissioned by Swaminarayan himself.

An engineering college named Narnarayan Shastri Institute of Technology is situated in Jetalpur.

References 

 Map of Gujarat with Jetalpur marked on it

Swaminarayan Sampradaya
Cities and towns in Ahmedabad district